= Sensui Shoji =

Sensui Shoji (Japanese: 庄司 浅水, Hepburn: Shōji Sensui; 10 November 1903 – 7 September 1991) was a Japanese bibliophile and author. He wrote and translated over 100 books and articles, mainly on the history of Japanese and Western literature, but also in the area of the supernatural.

== Selected publications ==
=== Bibliographic ===
- 書籍装釘の歴史と実際（1929）
- 書物の話（1931）
- 書物のはなし 語りべから現代の書物まで（1956）
- 本の文化史 ブック・アラカルト（1963）
- 紙魚のたわごと（1966）
- 本の世界（1970）
- 愛書六十五年 一書物人のメモの中から（1983）
- 書物よもやま話（1986）
- 定本庄司浅水著作集 書誌編（14 volumes, 1979-1983）

=== Other ===
- 世界の奇談(1958)
- 海の奇談(1961)
- 世界の秘話(1962)
- 世界の怪談(1964)
- 世界の秘境(1965)
- 世界の魔の海(1965)
- 世界の驚異をたずねて(1965)
- 世界の怪奇ミステリー(1973)
- 世界の怪奇(1975)
- 庄司浅水ノンフィクション著作集(12 volumes, 1987–1988)
